Gabriela Gonçalves Dias Moreschi (born 8 July 1994) is a Brazilian handballer for SG BBM Bietigheim and the Brazilian national team.

Achievements
Norwegian League:
Winner: 2017
Silver Medalist: 2018
Norwegian Cup:
Winner: 2016, 2017
South American Games:
Gold Medalist: 2018
EHF European League:
Winner: 2022
Bundesliga:
Winner: 2022

References

External links

1994 births
Living people
Brazilian female handball players
People from Maringá
Expatriate handball players
Brazilian expatriate sportspeople in Norway
Brazilian expatriate sportspeople in France
Brazilian expatriate sportspeople in Romania
South American Games gold medalists for Brazil
South American Games medalists in handball
Competitors at the 2018 South American Games
Sportspeople from Paraná (state)